Darkoo is a Nigerian-born British rapper and singer. She came to prominence following the release of her single "Gangsta", featuring One Acen, which peaked at number 22 on the Official Singles Chart, and peaked at number one, on the UK Afrobeats Chart of 2020.

Early life 
Darkoo was born in Lagos, Nigeria, moving to the UK at the age of 7 and being raised in South London.

Career 
Darkoo began releasing music at the age of 15, starting out as a drill rapper before beginning to incorporate singing into her music. In late 2019 she released the single "Gangsta", featuring British rapper One Acen. The song came to prominence on TikTok and entered the Official Singles Chart at number 34 in November 2019, eventually reaching a peak of 22 in January 2020. She followed up this success in March 2020 with the single "Juicy" featuring Hardy Caprio, which peaked at 62 on the Official Singles Chart. At the 2020 MOBO Awards, Darkoo was nominated for Best Female Act and Best Newcomer, whilst "Gangsta" was nominated for Song of the Year.

In April 2021, Darkoo featured on a remix of "Body", originally performed by Russ Millions and Tion Wayne. The remix helped the song reach number 1 in the Official Singles Chart.

Darkoo released her debut EP, 2 In 1, in July 2021, featuring artists such as Tion Wayne and Unknown T.

Discography

Singles

As lead artist

As featured artist

References 

Living people
21st-century Black British women singers
Black British women rappers
Singers from London
Nigerian emigrants to the United Kingdom
2001 births